Max Wallner (1891-1951) was a German operetta librettist and screenwriter.

Selected filmography
 Death Over Shanghai (1932)
 Contest (1932)
 Gypsy Blood (1934)
 You Are Adorable, Rosmarie (1934)
 The Last Waltz (1934)
 All Because of the Dog (1935)
 Everything for a Woman (1935)
 The Schimeck Family (1935)
 Every Day Isn't Sunday (1935)
 The Red Rider (1935)
 The Bird Seller (1935)
 Lumpaci the Vagabond (1936)
 Flowers from Nice (1936)
 The Last Waltz (1936, French)
 The Last Waltz (1936, British)
 Premiere (1937)
 Meiseken (1937)
 Premiere (1938, British)
 Falstaff in Vienna (1940)
 Bonjour Kathrin (1956)
 Season in Salzburg (1961)

References

Bibliography 
 Von Dassanowsky, Robert. Screening Transcendence: Film Under Austrofascism and the Hollywood Hope, 1933-1938. Indiana University Press, 2018

External links 
 

1891 births
1951 deaths
Film people from Frankfurt
German librettists
German male screenwriters
20th-century German screenwriters